Honnihal is a village in Belgaum district in the southern state of Karnataka, India.

References

Villages in Belagavi district
ಹೊನ್ನಿಹಾಳ ನ್ನು ನಕ್ಷೆಯಲ್ಲಿ ತೋರಿಸಿದ್ದು ತಪ್ಪು

ಅದು ತೋರಿಸಿದ್ದು ಮವಿನಕಟ್ಟಿ. ಪಂತ ಬಾಳೆಕುಂದ್ರಿ ಎದುರುಗಡೆ ಇರುವ ಊರೇ ಹೊನ್ನಿಹಾಳ. ನಕ್ಷೆಯಲ್ಲಿ ತಪ್ಪಾಗಿದೆ. ಸರಿಮಾಡಿ
Kengeri